Chung Yun-seong and Ajeet Rai were the defending champions but chose not to defend their title.

Marek Gengel and Adam Pavlásek won the title after defeating Robert Galloway and Hans Hach Verdugo 7–6(7–4), 6–4 in the final.

Seeds

Draw

References

External links
 Main draw

Nonthaburi Challenger - Doubles